The 96th Massachusetts General Court, consisting of the Massachusetts Senate and the Massachusetts House of Representatives, met in 1875 during the governorship of William Gaston. George B. Loring served as president of the Senate and John E. Sanford served as speaker of the House.

Notable legislation included an "Act To Provide For The Supervision Of The Construction And Maintenance Of Reservoirs And Dams."

Senators

Representatives

See also
 44th United States Congress
 List of Massachusetts General Courts

References

Further reading
  (includes description of legislature)

External links
 
 

Political history of Massachusetts
Massachusetts legislative sessions
massachusetts
1875 in Massachusetts